Cascar may refer to:
 CASCAR, the Canadian Association for Stock Car Auto Racing 
 Kashgar, an oasis city in Xinjiang, China

See also 
 Kaskar (disambiguation)